The Cetinje Octoechos ( or Cetinjski oktoih) is an Orthodox liturgical book printed in 1494 in Cetinje, the capital  of the Principality of Zeta (present-day Montenegro). It is the first incunabulum written in the Serbian recension of Church Slavonic, as well as the first book printed in Cyrillic in Southeast Europe. The octoechos was produced  under the direction of Hieromonk Makarije at the Crnojević printing house, which was founded in 1493 by Đurađ Crnojević, the ruler of Zeta. Printed in two instalments, its first volume contains the hymns to be sung to the first four tones of the Octoechos system of musical modes, and the hymns for the remaining four tones are included in the second volume. The two volumes are called Octoechos of the First Tone (Oktoih prvoglasnik) and Octoechos of the Fifth Tone (Oktoih petoglasnik), respectively.

Octoechos of the First Tone
Octoechos of the First Tone (Oktoih prvoglasnik) was finished on 4 January 1494. There are 108 copies of this book which survived. It contains 270 leaves sized 29 x 21.6 cm. It is characterized by high quality and clean two-coloured printing, red and black, with finely formed letters. It is decorated with headpieces and initials printed from woodcuts in the spirit of the Renaissance with traces of old manuscript traditions. In the quality of its print and decoration it is considered to be at the same level as Venetian production at that time. The National Library of Montenegro "Đurđe Crnojević" in Cetinje published 600 facsimiles of Octoechos of the First Tone in 1987.

Octoechos of the Fifth Tone

Octoechos of the Fifth Tone (Oktoih petoglasnik) represents the first illustrated South Slavic incunabulum. It is preserved in fragments, the longest one containing 37 leaves. It has six woodcut illustrations, made by an artist who managed to put rather complex compositions with many characters on a relatively small space.

See also 
 Božidar Vuković

References

Sources

Further reading

External links
Cetinje Octoechos (incomplete), the Library of Matica Srpska

15th-century Christian texts
Medieval Serbian literature
Montenegrin literature
Serbian literature
History of the Serbian Orthodox Church in Montenegro
Principality of Zeta
Cyrillic manuscripts
Incunabula
Psalters
Serbian books
Serbian manuscripts